The Grimaldi Ministry was a Spanish government headed by Jerónimo Grimaldi which lasted between 9 October 1763 and 19 February 1777. Following Spain's disastrous performance in the Seven Years' War, Grimaldi was tasked with pushing through reforms of the navy, army, public finances and colonial administration system which he did with some success. His government was packed with reforms known as Grillos, many of whom wanted to remodel the Spanish state to closer resemble that of Britain.

In 1777 he was dismissed by Charles III and made Spanish Ambassador to Rome. He was replaced by the Floridablanca Ministry which served from 1777 to 1792.

Bibliography
 Simms, Brendan. Three Victories and a Defeat: The Rise and Fall of the First British Empire. Penguin Books 2008.

Spanish governments
1763 establishments in Spain
1777 disestablishments in Spain